The Midland Regiment was an infantry regiment of the Non-Permanent Active Militia of the Canadian Militia and later the Canadian Army. The regiment was formed in 1936 by the Amalgamation of The Northumberland Regiment and The Durham Regiment. In 1954, The Midland Regiment was Amalgamated into The Hastings and Prince Edward Regiment.

Lineage

The Midland Regiment 

 Originated on 5 October 1866, in Cobourg, Ontario, as the 40th Northumberland Battalion of Infantry
 Redesignated on 8 May 1900, as the 40th Northumberland Regiment
 Redesignated on 12 March 1920, as The Northumberland (Ontario) Regiment
 Redesignated on 15 May 1924, as The Northumberland Regiment
 Amalgamated on 15 December 1936, with The Durham Regiment and Redesignated as The Midland Regiment (Northumberland and Durham)
 Redesignated on 7 November 1940, as the 2nd (Reserve) Battalion, The Midland Regiment (Northumberland and Durham)
 Redesignated on 1 June 1945, as The Midland Regiment (Northumberland and Durham)
 Redesignated on 1 April 1946, as The Midland Regiment
 Amalgamated on 1 September 1954, with 9th Anti-Tank Regiment (Self-Propelled) (Argyll Light Infantry), RCA, the 34th Anti-Tank Battery (Self Propelled), RCA, and The Hastings and Prince Edward Regiment

The Durham Regiment 

 Originated on 16 November 1866, in Port Hope, Ontario, as the 46th East Durham Battalion of Infantry
 Redesignated on 1 August 1897, as the 46th Durham Battalion of Infantry
 Redesignated on 8 May 1900, as the 46th Durham Regiment
 Redesignated on 12 March 1920, as The Durham Regiment
 Amalgamated on 15 December 1936, with The Northumberland Regiment and Redesignated as The Midland Regiment (Northumberland and Durham)

Perpetuations 

 39th Battalion, CEF
 136th (Durham) Battalion, CEF
 139th (Northumberland) Battalion, CEF

History

1936-1939 
As a direct result of the 1936 Canadian Militia Reorganization, The Midland Regiment (Northumberland and Durham) was formed by the Amalgamation of The Northumberland Regiment and The Durham Regiment.

The Second World War 
On 26 August 1939, Details from The Midland Regiment were called out on service and then placed on active service on 1 September 1939, for local protection duties under the designation The Midland Regiment (Northumberland and Durham), CASF. On 31 December 1940, these details were disbanded.

On 24 May 1940, the regiment then mobilized The Midland Regiment (Northumberland and Durham), CASF, for active service and on 7 November 1940, the unit was again redesignated as the 1st Battalion, The Midland Regiment (Northumberland and Durham), CASF. The battalion served in Canada in a home defence role as part of the Prince Rupert Defences, 8th Canadian Infantry Division. On 10 January 1945, the battalion embarked for Great Britain. After its arrival in the UK, on 18 January 1945, the battalion was disbanded to provide reinforcements to the Canadian Army in the field.

Post War 
On 1 April 1946, the regiment was Redesignated as The Midland Regiment.

On 1 September 1954, as a result of the Kennedy Report on the Reserve Army, The Midland Regiment was Amalgamated along with the 9th Anti-Tank Regiment (Self-Propelled) (Argyll Light Infantry), RCA into The Hastings and Prince Edward Regiment.

Organization 
The Midland Regiment (Northumberland and Durham) (15 December 1936)

 Regimental HQ (Cobourg, Ontario)
 A Company (Cobourg, Ontario)
 B Company (Campbellford, Ontario)
 C Company (Millbrook, Ontario)
 D Company (Orono, Ontario)

Alliances 

  - The Royal Northumberland Fusiliers (1936-1954)
  - The Durham Light Infantry (Until 1954)

Battle Honours

North-West Rebellion 

 North West Canada, 1885

The Great War 

 Mount Sorrel
 Somme, 1916
 Arras, 1917, ’18
 Hill 70
 Ypres, 1917
 Amiens
 Hindenburg Line
 Pursuit to Mons
 The Great War, 1915-17

Notable Members 

 Honorary Colonel Vincent Massey

References 

Midland Regiment
Infantry regiments of Canada
Infantry regiments of Canada in World War II
Military units and formations established in 1936
Military units and formations disestablished in 1954